Chandra Kumala School (formerly Chandra Kusuma School) is known as   SPK school ( Satuan Pendidikan Kerjasama).   The international curriculum provided at this school is from Cambridge International Examinations (reference number ID124).  The school is located in Deli Serdang,  a regency of North Sumatra.

It is a registered International Examination Centre which also accepts private students for assessment.  There is also a full and partial scholarship for both disadvantaged, and exceptional students.

References

Schools in Indonesia
Cambridge schools in Indonesia